Jeffery Dale is a former professional American football safety in the National Football League. He played three seasons for the San Diego Chargers.

Dale was born October 6, 1962 in Pineville, Louisiana, and grew up in Winnfield. He was an All-American running back and safety for four years at Winnfield High School in Winnfield, Louisiana. He was then recruited as a safety and started at Louisiana State University.

From 2001 - 2010, Dale was a director for Aramark, including at St. Jude's Children's Research Hospital in Memphis, Tennessee.

Dale received his Master's in Healthcare Administration from the University of Washington in 2011.  He is currently a director at Harborview Medical Center in Seattle, WA.

References 

1962 births
Living people
People from Pineville, Louisiana
Players of American football from Louisiana
American football safeties
LSU Tigers football players
San Diego Chargers players
Sportspeople from Rapides Parish, Louisiana